Thomas William McGee (May 24, 1924 – December 21, 2012) was an American politician who served as a member of the Lynn, Massachusetts City Council (1956–1963) and Democratic member of the Massachusetts House of Representatives (1963–1991), serving as its Speaker from 1975 to 1984. He was the father of former Massachusetts state Senator and Mayor of Lynn Thomas M. McGee.

McGee died on December 21, 2012 in a hospice facility in Danvers, Massachusetts, of complications from Alzheimer's.

See also
 1963–1964 Massachusetts legislature
 1965–1966 Massachusetts legislature
 1967–1968 Massachusetts legislature
 1969–1970 Massachusetts legislature
 1971–1972 Massachusetts legislature
 1973–1974 Massachusetts legislature
 1975–1976 Massachusetts legislature
 1977–1978 Massachusetts legislature
 1979–1980 Massachusetts legislature
 1981–1982 Massachusetts legislature
 1983–1984 Massachusetts legislature
 1985–1986 Massachusetts legislature
 1987–1988 Massachusetts legislature
 1989–1990 Massachusetts legislature

References

1924 births
United States Marine Corps personnel of World War II
Boston University School of Law alumni
United States Marines
Battle of Iwo Jima
Lynn, Massachusetts City Council members
Speakers of the Massachusetts House of Representatives
Democratic Party members of the Massachusetts House of Representatives
2012 deaths
20th-century American politicians
Neurological disease deaths in Massachusetts
Deaths from Alzheimer's disease
Burials in Massachusetts